Nteng is a West Chadic language spoken in Plateau State, Nigeria. Nteng is spoken in the villages of Nteng, Geer, Ɗok, Kelaghal, Lool, Kwaki, Jekmorop, and Gorom, with Gorom being a primarily Bwal-speaking village. Roger Blench (2017) estimates that there are 2,000 speakers as of 2017.

Although Nteng is most closely related to the Pan cluster of languages, it has also been influenced by Mushere.

Geographical distribution
Nteng is spoken in Nteng village and seven other villages of Qua'an Pan Local Government Area, Plateau State, Nigeria. Besides Nteng village, the other Nteng-speaking villages are Gyeer, Ɗoop, Kelaghan, Loon, Kwakii, Zhep Morop, and Gorom. (Gorom is the only village that is currently listed in maps; Gorom is also predominant a Bwall-speaking village.) Some village names and their phonetic pronunciations in IPA:

References

Blench, Roger. 2017. Current research on the A3 West Chadic languages.
Hon, Luther and Gobak, Fittokka and Agwom, Izang and John Muniru and Nweke, Uche S. 2014. A Sociolinguistic Survey of the Kofyar (Koffiar) of Plateau State, Nigeria. Ms. Jos: Language Development Facilitators.

West Chadic languages
Languages of Nigeria